Ancylosis nigripunctella is a species of snout moth in the genus Ancylosis. It was described in 1879 by Staudinger based on material collected by H. G. Henke in the Ryn-Peski Desert ("Rün Peski") in Western Kazakhstan. It is reported from Kazakhstan, Egypt and Turkey.

The species must not be confused with Ancylosis nigripunctella (Amsel, 1959), which is a secondary junior homonym of Ancylosis nigripunctella (Staudinger, 1879). The replacement name for the junior homonym of Amsel is Ancylosis obscuripunctella Roesler, 1973.

The wingspan is about 16 mm.

References

nigripunctella
Moths of Europe
Moths of Asia
Moths of Africa